St. John the Baptist Parish (SJBP) is a parish located in the U.S. state of Louisiana. At the 2020 census, the population was 42,477. The parish seat is Edgard, an unincorporated area, and the largest city is LaPlace, which is also unincorporated.

St. John the Baptist Parish was established in 1807 as one of the original 19 parishes of the Territory of Orleans, which became the state of Louisiana.

St. John the Baptist Parish is part of the New Orleans–Metairie metropolitan statistical area.

This was considered part of the German Coast in the 18th and 19th centuries, named for numerous German immigrants who settled along the Mississippi River here in the 1720s.  On January 8, 1811, the largest slave insurrection in US history, known as the German Coast Uprising, started here.  It was short-lived, but more than 200 slaves gathered from plantations along the river and marched through St. Charles Parish toward New Orleans. This is part of the Sugarland or sugar parishes, which were devoted to sugar cane cultivation. Planters used large numbers of enslaved African-Americans before the war, and numerous freedmen stayed in the area to work on these plantations afterward.

The parish includes three nationally significant examples of 19th-century plantation architecture: Evergreen Plantation, Whitney Plantation Historic District, and San Francisco Plantation House.

History
Present-day St. John the Baptist Parish includes the third permanent settlement in what is now the state of Louisiana, after Natchitoches (1714) and New Orleans (1718). It was considered part of the German Coast. The area was settled in the early 1720s by a group of German colonists. Many families established towns close to the Mississippi River in the areas now known as Lucy, Garyville, and Reserve. The area was under the French regime until 1763, when France ceded Louisiana to Spain after losing the Seven Years' War to Great Britain (this was known as the French and Indian War on the North American front).

At the beginning of the Spanish colonial period, many Acadians, people of French descent, began arriving in south Louisiana due to being expelled by the British from what is now Nova Scotia. The British took over French territory in Canada and in North America east of the Mississippi river. The first Acadian village was established in what is now Wallace, Louisiana. The German and French cultures thrived alongside one another, but French came to be the dominant language. They developed a culture known as Cajun.

In 1769, Acadians who settled in the area began a search for land to build a church. The governing Spanish authority at the time approved the request, and the land was expropriated on February 21, 1770. The first church stood in the same location as the modern St. John the Baptist Church. The new church carried the same name as the original chapel along the German Coast settlement. The first pastor was Spanish Capuchin Father Bernardo de Limpach. The first church records indicate a marriage between Antoine Manz and Sibylla Bischof in 1772. The first church stood tall until it was swept away by floodwaters in 1821.

The early settlers in the area received land grants from the Spanish or French royal governments, depending upon which country owned the territory at the time of application. The French style of property allotments was made up of narrow frontage on the river so that each plantation had access for transportation of goods to and from New Orleans and world markets. The main house and supporting outbuildings were constructed near the river. The remaining property extended away from the river deeply into the wetlands, where land was cleared for cultivation of sugar cane.

Most transportation was done by boat, mainly on the bayous and lakes of the area, but via the Mississippi River as well, for decades into the 19th century.  St. John, with its fertile land being nine feet above sea level, proved to be an excellent settlement for farming and agriculture. In the late 18th century, planters began to invest more in labor-intensive sugar cane cultivation and processing, increasing their demand for slave labor. Sugar production meant prosperity for the planters and New Orleans. Planters held large numbers of slaves, to the extent that the sugar and cotton parishes all had black majorities before the Civil War.

With the sugar wealth, some wealthy planters built elaborate houses and outbuildings.  Three survive in St. John parish; each is recognized for its national architectural and historic significance. On the west bank are the major complex of house and outbuildings designated as the Whitney Plantation Historic District and the National Historic Landmark (NHL) of Evergreen Plantation.  San Francisco Plantation House, also a designated NHL, is on the east bank.  San Francisco and Evergreen plantations are open to the public for tours. The Whitney plantation house is planned for renovation. Whitney and Evergreen plantations are both included among the first 26 sites on the Louisiana African American Heritage Trail.

In January 1811, the German Coast Uprising started in this parish.  It was the largest slave insurrection in US history, but it was short-lived.  The slaves killed two whites, but suffered 96 deaths among their forces at the hands of the militia and in executions after quick trials afterward. They attacked five plantations and burned three houses to the ground.  Charles Deslondes, a mulatto or mixed-race slave brought from Saint-Domingue before the success of its revolution, was one of the leaders of the insurrection.  He and his followers were influenced by the ideals and promises of the French and Haitian revolutions. Slavery was ended on Saint-Domingue after the French Revolution, but reimposed before the slaves gained independence.

Deslondes gathered more than 200 slaves from plantations along the way, marching downriver into St. Charles Parish toward New Orleans before meeting much resistance.  Unable to get the arms they had planned on, the slaves were defeated by the well-armed informal and territorial militias.  During these confrontations and executions after brief trials, Deslondes and ninety-five slaves were killed.  Decades before the American Civil War and emancipation, their actions expressed African Americans' deep desire for freedom.

As the number of white families in the settlement increased, they wanted education for their children. Before the Civil War, typically planters would hire tutors, often college graduates from the North, who would live with the family for an extended period of time, typically two years.  The tutor would teach all of the planter's children, and sometimes the family would arrange for other neighborhood children to join the classes as well.

In 1869, following the Civil War, families wanting French instruction founded private schools to continue their culture.  The Reconstruction legislature established the first public schools in the state during this period, but it took time for the state to arrange adequate funding for public education. The first high schools at Edgard and Reserve were not built until 1909. Students traveled to the schools by horse-drawn buses or by train.

Geography
It is the third-smallest parish in Louisiana by land area and fifth-smallest by total area.

St. John the Baptist Parish, Louisiana is located on the Mississippi River approximately  upriver from the Gulf of Mexico and  upriver from the City of New Orleans. The area, known as the River Region, has an abundance of natural resources and a mild "Sunbelt" climate. The New Orleans/River Region contains a good supply of raw materials, which has helped Louisiana maintain a high rank in the United States in the production of natural gas, petroleum, sulfur, salt, and fur pelts. High silica sands, lime, clays, timber, seafood, and various agricultural products are also produced in abundance.

St. John the Baptist Parish is bisected by the Mississippi River. Though the River separates the Parish into northern and southern parts, the former is still referred to as the "east bank" and the latter as the "west bank," referring to the direction of the river as it reaches the Gulf of Mexico. The Mississippi provides an important transportation corridor which supports the heavy industry located in the area.

St. John the Baptist Parish is bordered by St. Charles Parish and Lake Pontchartrain to the east, Lake Pontchartrain and Lake Maurepas to the north, Lafourche Parish and Lac des Allemands to the south, and St. James Parish to the west. It is one of four parishes which comprise the "River Parishes;" St. John Parish is the heart of the "River Parishes."

This section of the state, also consisting of St. James, Ascension, and St. Charles Parishes, makes up the area along the Mississippi River between New Orleans and Baton Rouge. Since the mid-20th century, when the oil industry developed from resources found here, all of these parishes are home to at least one major chemical- and/or petroleum-processing facility. The industry is the major source of employment in the region but it has had adverse environmental effects. St. John the Baptist parish has the highest rate of environmental cancer of any census tract in the United States.

Much of the parish is either open water or wetlands. The wetlands are currently protected by federal law and development is limited to what is permitted by the U.S. Army Corps of Engineers and/or the Federal Wildlife and Fisheries Department.

Higher ground in the parish is found in an alluvial plain which generally borders the Mississippi River on both sides.  Soil deposits from the Mississippi's annual flooding created a rich and fertile area which has historically been intensively farmed (sugar cane, soybeans, feed corn, and occasional cotton). This fact, and the natural transportation corridor supplied by the river, resulted in the creation of numerous plantations and farms along the lower Mississippi Valley.

Many of these plantations were large tracts of land with modest or average-sized homes and outbuildings found on the higher ground. Several, however, were improved with palatial mansions.  Three of the larger homes have survived in St. John Parish, as noted in the History above.

The higher ground along the banks was used to grow crops, while the wetlands were valued for their abundant timber, hunting and fishing.  For years development in the River Parishes was limited to those areas that were naturally higher and less prone to flooding.  Until the existing levees and pump systems were built, however, few places were truly safe from high water. Even today, most of the parish is considered a flood hazard area according to FEMA Flood Maps.

Adjacent parishes
 Tangipahoa Parish (north)
 St. Charles Parish (southeast)
 Lafourche Parish (south)
 St. James Parish (west)
 Ascension Parish (northwest)
 Livingston Parish (northwest)

Communities

St. John the Baptist Parish has no incorporated areas.

Census-designated places
 Edgard
 Garyville
 LaPlace
 Pleasure Bend
 Reserve
 Wallace

Unincorporated communities
 Mount Airy
 Welcome
 Dutch Bayou
 Cornland
 Lions

Ghost Towns
 St. John the Baptist Parish had two more communities on its east bank, Ruddock and Frenier, which were settled on the isthmus between Lake Maurepas and Lake Pontchartrain, 10 miles (16.093 km) NNE of LaPlace. In 1892, Ruddock founded by the Ruddock Cypress Company was made into a sawmill town. In September 1915, the 1915 New Orleans Hurricane hit Ruddock and the nearby town of Frenier, destroying the towns and killing some of the residents. Today, Ruddock and Frenier are ghost towns in the parish as well as memorials to themselves. All that remains of Ruddock is rotted wood from Buildings and vegetation. Yet Freneir still has a few buildings being seafood restaurants and a small number of houses all of which are built high to prevent flooding. Nevertheless, Ruddock is still marked on an I-55 exit sign and both are seen on Louisiana road maps, Freneir still has an entrance sign on Highway 51 marking it as a fishing village. It can be seen off I-10 on Lake Pontchartrain.

Demographics

The 2019 census estimates determined 42,242 people lived in the parish. The racial and ethnic makeup of the parish was 56.5% Black and African American, 38.2% non-Hispanic white, 1.1% Asian, 2.7% some other race, and 1.5% multiracial; of the population, 6.1% were Hispanic and Latin American of any race. Among the population, Spanish was the second most-spoken language as of 2019; approximately 4.0% of the parish population were foreign-born. French ancestry was the largest heritage among the parish population (9.7%).

In 2019, there were 15,720 households living in 17,778 housing units. There were also 3,758 businesses operating in the parish, with the majority being minority-owned. The parish had an employment rate of 56.2% in 2019, and 78.5% of the population lived in owner-occupied units. The median home value was $153,900, and median gross rent was $933. The median household income was $57,429; males had a median income of $53,849 versus $36,476 for females. An estimated 24.8% of the population lived at or below the poverty line.

By the publication of the 2020 United States census, there were 42,477 people, 15,270 households, and 11,104 families residing in the parish. Among the parish population, 56.68% of the population were Black and African American, 31.42% non-Hispanic white, 0.25% Native American, 0.74% Asian, 0.02% Pacific Islander, 3.15% multiracial or some other race, and 7.75% Hispanic or Latin American of any race. The increase in Hispanic or Latinos and other non-White Americans has been attributed to a nationwide demographic shift.

According to the Association of Religion Data Archives in 2020, with Christianity being the predominant religion, Roman Catholics numbered 15,068 adherents—remaining the historically largest single Christian denomination for the parish. Non- or inter-denominational churches spread among the independent congregationalist, Bible, and United and Uniting churches were the second largest Christian group, numbering 7,230; the increase in non/inter-denominational Protestant Christianity reflected increasing ecumenical trends throughout the state.

Government

St. John the Baptist Parish leans heavily towards the Democratic Party. It has not voted for a Republican presidential candidate since Ronald Reagan in 1984, and before that voted Republican only three other times in the 20th century: for Warren G. Harding in 1920, when Acadian voters broke with President Woodrow Wilson over various issues, for Dwight D. Eisenhower in 1956, when he flipped the state as a whole, and for Richard Nixon in 1972, when he won all but one parish in Louisiana. It also supported the third-party bid of George Wallace in 1968.

Prior to passage of the 1898 constitution, which almost completely disenfranchised black voters and made Louisiana an effective one-party state, St. John the Baptist Parish generally voted Republican. In fact, it did so in every presidential election from 1872 until 1896.

At the state level, the parish is also heavily Democratic. St. John the Baptist was Governor John Bel Edwards' second strongest in the 2019 election, giving him 74% of the vote.

Education
The St. John the Baptist Parish School Board operates 10 public schools within the parish, the Archdiocese of New Orleans oversees 5 religious schools within the parish and there are 2 privately run schools within the parish.

http://www.louisianabelieves.com/data/reportcards/2013/

It is in the service area of Delgado Community College.

National Guard
The 1084th Transportation Company of the 165th CSS Battalion of the Louisiana National Guard resides in Reserve, Louisiana.

Transportation

Major highways

  Interstate 10
  Interstate 55
  U.S. Highway 51
  U.S. Highway 61
  Louisiana Highway 18
  Louisiana Highway 44
  Louisiana Highway 3127
  Louisiana Highway 3188
  Louisiana Highway 3213

East Bank - The primary artery on the east bank of St. John Parish is Airline Highway (U.S. Highway 61). This five-lane, asphalt-paved road was once the predominant route linking Baton Rouge and New Orleans. Though it is still heavily traveled, much of the New Orleans-Baton Rouge traffic has been diverted to Interstate 10, located in the northern part of the parish. Interstate 10, a divided, controlled-access highway, has two interchanges in St. John Parish; one at Belle Terre Boulevard and the second at U.S. Highway 51/Interstate 55, both in LaPlace.

Interstate 55, a north–south route leading to Jackson, Mississippi, and beyond, intersects Interstate 10 in the northeastern sector of LaPlace.  A third Interstate 10 interchange exists just west of the St. John Parish line near Gramercy (St. James Parish).

River Road, also known as Jefferson Highway or Louisiana Highway 44, is a two-lane, asphalt-paved, winding highway which parallels the Mississippi River.  Most of the heavy industry in the parish fronts on this road.

West Bank - Most of the development on the west bank lies along Louisiana Highway 18 (the Great River Road), a two-lane, asphalt-paved highway which parallels the Mississippi River similarly to Highway 44 on the east bank.  In addition to Louisiana 18, the west bank has Louisiana Highway 3127 or the River Parishes Highway, which is roughly equivalent to the east bank's Airline Highway in that it follows the Mississippi.  It is not as winding nor as populated as River Road.  Highway 3127 leads to Donaldsonville upriver from St. John Parish.  It is home of the "Sunshine Bridge" over the Mississippi River in Ascension Parish.  This road has little development on either side and is generally surrounded by wetlands in St. John Parish.

Veterans Memorial Bridge or Gramercy Bridge - (Louisiana Highway 3213) This bridge originates on the east bank of St. James Parish near Gramercy/Lutcher and has access to I-10 and Airline Highway via Louisiana Highway 641.  The foot of the bridge on the west bank is in St. John Parish near Wallace, with a tie-in to Louisiana Highway 3127 that opened June 18, 2008.  The opening of this bridge has spurred the development hoped for along the west bank of St. John Parish. (The bridge is known as the "Bridge to Nowhere.")

Access to the west bank of St. John Parish is also provided by a ferry crossing at Reserve/Edgard and by the Hale Boggs Memorial Bridge over the Mississippi in St. Charles Parish.

See also

 National Register of Historic Places listings in St. John the Baptist Parish, Louisiana
 German Coast
 1811 German Coast Uprising
 River Parishes

References

External links
 Parish Government's website

 
Saint John the Baptist Parish, Louisiana
Saint John the Baptist Parish, Louisiana
Saint John the Baptist Parish, Louisiana
Louisiana parishes on the Mississippi River
Parishes in Acadiana
1807 establishments in the Territory of Orleans
Populated places established in 1807
Black Belt (U.S. region)
Majority-minority parishes in Louisiana